Haworthiopsis granulata (synonym Haworthia granulata) is a succulent plant in the subfamily Asphodeloideae, found in the Cape Provinces of South Africa.

References

granulata
Flora of the Cape Provinces